Johannes Justus (Hon Yost) Schuyler (January 1, 1744 – 1810) was a Tory with patriot roots, who was used by American General Benedict Arnold to repel the British and Indian forces of Colonel Barry St. Leger and Joseph Brant from their siege of Fort Stanwix following the Battle of Oriskany during the American Revolution.

Early life
He was the son of Peter D. Schuyler (b.1723) and Elisabeth Barbara Herkimer. His mother was the sister of American General Nicholas Herkimer (1728–1777) and loyalist Johan Jost Herkimer (1732–1795).  His father was a cousin of American General Philip Schuyler (see Schuyler family). Hon Yost grew up in the Mohawk Valley in the Colony of New York, prior to the American Revolution. Hon Yost's parents were poor and apparently he socialized more with the Mohawks (who sided with the British during the war) than with the white patriots of the area. He has been variously described as dim-witted, coarse and ignorant, a half idiot, a madman, and a lunatic, but also as possessing "no small degree of shrewdness." Whatever the traits of this "singular being", the Mohawks saw him as special — perhaps as a prophet in contact with the supernatural. Hon-Yost tended to dress the part, adopting Iroquois manners as well as clothing. Tory leaders are said to have used his influence with the Mohawks to help maintain their support in defeating the revolutionary Americans.

Captured by the Patriots
This influence was turned against the British in 1777, when Hon Yost was captured along with Lieutenant Walter N. Butler (Colonel John Butler's son) from St. Leger's army at a meeting of Tories at the home of a Mr. Shoemaker in German Flatts, near Fort Dayton. Butler was sentenced to be hanged, but eventually escaped. Hon Yost Schuyler was also condemned to death. His mother and brother Nicholas Schuyler traveled from their home in Little Falls, New York to Fort Dayton where he was being held, presumably around the same time that General Arnold's force arrived to aid in the defense of Fort Stanwix, which had recently been captured and rebuilt by the Americans and renamed Fort Schuyler.

As Mrs. Schuyler pleaded with Arnold to spare her son's life, it was suggested that, because of Hon Yost's influence with the Mohawks and Tories, he be sent to Fort Stanwix to alert St. Leger's forces of Arnold's intention to attack, and to greatly exaggerate the number of forces. His mother offered to allow herself to be taken hostage to insure her son's return. Arnold agreed however to take Hon Yost's brother Nicholas hostage in her place.

Hon Yost's clothing was hung up and shot to make it look like he had narrowly escaped his capture by the patriots. Then he and an Oneida messenger (Oneidas sided with the Americans during that war) traveled by different routes to the vicinity of Fort Schuyler. Separately they talked up the size of Arnold's army among both Brant's warriors and St. Leger himself. Hon Yost is said to have looked up and pointed to leaves in the trees when asked how many men Arnold had.

The Iroquois rejected Hon Yost's tale, but gave up the siege when reports from other Iroquois messengers arrived with increasing estimates. The Iroquois and British left the siege through Oneida Lake. Hon Yost followed the British forces a short way and then returned to Fort Dayton. His brother was released, but Hon Yost soon ran away to rejoin the Tories.

See also
Schuyler family

References 
Sources
 James Thomas Flexner, How a Madman helped save the Colonies, American Heritage Magazine, 1956
Elizabeth Eggleston Seelye, Brant and Red Jacket, Ch. 30, How a Simpleton Raised the Siege,1879
Lorenzo Sabine, Biographical Sketches of Loyalists of the American Revolution, 1864
Kevin Scott Gould, Ambush At Oriskany
Hubert H. Bancroft, ed. The Great Republic by the Master Historians: Benson J. Lossing, The Expedition Against Fort Schuyler
George Peck, D.D, Wyoming; Its History, Stirring Incidents and Romantic Adventures 1858
Robert Leckie, George Washington's War: The Saga of the American Revolution, HarperCollins, 1992
James Kirby Martin, Benedict Arnold, Revolutionary Hero: An American Warrior Reconsidered, New York University Press, 1997
The Mohawk Valley During the Revolution, by Harold Frederic, 1877 (WikiSource)

1744 births
1810 deaths
Loyalists in the American Revolution from New York (state)
American people of Dutch descent
Schuyler family